Edge Hill railway station is a railway station that serves the district of Edge Hill, Liverpool, England and is one of the oldest railway stations in the world

There have been two stations of that name. The first stood a short distance south-west of the present station and its remains are still visible, although the site is not open to the public.

The station, and all trains serving it, are operated by Northern Trains. Avanti West Coast, East Midlands Railway, TransPennine Express and West Midlands Trains services pass through the station, although, they are non stop.

Early history 

The first station opened on 15 September 1830 as part of the Liverpool and Manchester Railway.

The largest bore, in the centre, was the  Wapping Tunnel, a long downwards incline leading to Wapping Dock and the world's first tunnel to be bored under a metropolis. The tunnel was worked by an endless rope running down the centre of one track and back along the other, the goods wagons descended by gravity, but were hauled up by the stationary steam engine. During the summer of 1829, prior to the tunnel opening for traffic, it became a popular subterranean promenade. It was whitewashed and lit by gas at intervals. On the 1 August alone, some three thousand people walked its length.

The tunnel to the north of the central bore was much shorter and inclined upwards, leading to the passenger terminal at Crown Street and a coal depot. Here the trains descended by gravity to Edge Hill station and were wound up into Crown Street.

The southern tunnel was originally a short length leading nowhere and used as a storage shed: its chief purpose was to create a symmetrical appearance. In 1832 it was cleared out and used as engine shed during the winters; later it became the wagon repairing shop until 1845 or 1846 when it was extended and expanded to provide two additional tracks into the Crown Street coal depot.

At the opposite end of the station area were two engine houses in the form of towers on either side of the line, which was spanned at this point by the famous Moorish Arch. The arch was decorative with two battlemented towers and decorated masonry forming a grand and impressive entrance to Liverpool. But the arch was also functional and served as a bridge connecting the two engine houses across the deep cutting.

There were engine sheds and workshops cut into the rock either side of the station area, others were fitted up as passengers' waiting rooms and offices, there being no room in the cutting for ordinary buildings.

The engines were supplied with steam from return-flue boilers, two on each side of the tracks in the cutting walls. The smoke was channelled down rock cut flues to tall chimneys – known as the 'Pillars of Hercules' – situated either side of the tunnel entrances. A steam connecting pipe was installed in 1832 enabling either set of boilers to be used for either engine, at the same time a pedestrian subway was installed so that staff could move between the engine houses without having to move through the operating railway.

The station area was mainly used for the marshalling of trains and the coupling and uncoupling of locomotives, but first class passengers could also join the trains here, conveyed by horse-drawn carriages from Dale Street in the city centre.

in 2022, the site was listed as a scheduled monument by Historic England.

The new station

As early as May 1831 the directors had concluded that Crown Street station was too far removed from the centre of Liverpool so they commissioned a survey to be made with a view to finding a way of bringing the railway into the town. George Stephenson produced a plan in June 1831 to provide a line, mainly in a tunnel, from Edge Hill to the cattle market at Haymarket. Liverpool Common Council approved the scheme subject to it being restricted to passengers only and plans were drawn up in October 1831 for submission to Parliament. The Bill received Royal Assent on 23 May 1832, tenders were let and work started in 1833.

Parliament had forbidden locomotives to run through tunnels and the railway had therefore to build stationary engines at the top of the incline up from Lime Street. The decision to extend the railway to Lime Street station required the construction of a new station at Edge Hill, situated to the north of the old station so that it was on the new line at the tunnel portal. Plans were approved in December 1834, and a contract for the construction of the new station and engine houses was let in March 1835.

Trains descended to Lime Street by gravity under the control of two brakesmen riding in an open brake waggon,  being rope-hauled by a winding engine back up to Edge Hill. This system, constructed by Mather, Dixon and Company under the direction of John Grantham, ended in 1870.

The new Edge Hill station was opened in 1836 and has been in continuous use ever since.

Sidings to the north of the station (sometimes called Exhibition Road after the adjacent thoroughfare leading to the exhibition hall) served as a terminus for excursionists visiting the 1886 "Shipperies" and 1887 Royal Jubilee Exhibitions.

The venue on Edge Lane had its own sidings to the south, including access to the building itself, for delivery of exhibits and removal of materials when the site closed.

Layout 
Facing west there are two tunnels visible from the platforms. The station consists of two island platforms, each with an original building dating from 1836. This makes it one of the world's oldest passenger railway station still in use, although the former Liverpool Road station in Manchester is the oldest surviving station building. Art exhibitions are held on the approach road to the Southern island platform. An arts centre called Metal now occupies part of the building on the Manchester-bound platform.

Around 400 yards from the station in the Manchester direction is a key junction, where the Merseytravel City lines separate into two: one goes towards  (serving the southern Liverpool-Manchester line and the West Coast Main Line) and the other towards  (serving the Wigan and Manchester Victoria lines). The Canada Dock Branch line runs through the station towards Bootle Oriel Road. There is also a carriage servicing depot just to the east of the junction on the line towards Mossley Hill which is used by Alstom to maintain train operator Virgin West Coast's Pendolino fleet.

The station buildings are Grade II listed. Network Rail applied for planning permission in November 2016 to update the ticket desk and counter to make it more accessible to passengers with disabilities.

The ticket office (on the northern island platform) is staffed throughout the day (05:30–00:10, Monday–Saturday). Whilst electronic ticket machines are present, in January 2021 customer information screens were installed and commissioned providing customers with train running information for all four platforms (which are linked by a subway). The buildings on platforms 3 and 4 are no longer in use by the railway, but are used by Metal Culture for Art studios. . Step-free access is available to platforms 1 and 2 only, as the subway to the other platforms has stairs.

Services 
Edge Hill lies on both routes of the Liverpool to Manchester Line from Liverpool Lime Street. There is no Sunday service.

Gallery

Points of interest 
Edge Hill is a haven for rail enthusiasts. There is a large freight yard operated by EWS, which mostly sees Class 60 locomotives, as a change from that company's more ubiquitous Class 66s. The yards are also home to a number of track maintenance units, some of which have not been moved for two decades.

In 2009 arts organisation Metal completed a major renovation of the Engine House, Boiler Room and Accumulator Tower at Edge Hill Station, after successfully raising capital funding from Kensington Regeneration, Merseytravel, Northern Rail, Railway Heritage Trust and Network Rail. This included works by Al and Al, entitled XXX: Get Off At Edge Hill.

Notes

References

Sources

Further reading

External links 

Subterranea Britannica

Edge Hill, Liverpool
Grade II* listed buildings in Liverpool
Grade II* listed railway stations
Railway stations in Liverpool
DfT Category E stations
Former London and North Western Railway stations
Railway stations in Great Britain opened in 1836
Northern franchise railway stations
Railway stations in Great Britain opened in 1830
1830 establishments in England